Many Waters is a 1986 novel by Madeleine L'Engle, part of the author's Time Quintet (also known as the Time Quartet).  The title is taken from the Song of Solomon 8:7: "Many waters cannot quench love, neither can the floods drown it.  If a man were to give all his wealth for love, it would be utterly scorned."

The principal characters of the story are Sandy and Dennys Murry, twin brothers who are somewhat out of place in the context of the multifarious and eccentric Murry family from A Wrinkle in Time. The action of the story follows that of A Wind in the Door but precedes the climactic, apocalyptic event in A Swiftly Tilting Planet.

Plot summary

In the middle of a New England winter, identical twin brothers Sandy and Dennys accidentally disturb an experiment in their parents' laboratory and are teleported to a sandy desert. There, they are acquired by water-prospector 'Japheth' and guided to an oasis, but Dennys is separated from the others. Sandy remains with Japheth and his elderly grandfather Lamech; there, Sandy is cured of heatstroke by a variety of improbable beings, including seraphim.

Dennys reappears in another tent and is thrown into a refuse heap. He later comes under the care of a friendly family in the center of the oasis, headed by a gruff but kindly patriarch called Noah. It soon becomes apparent that the boys have been interpolated into the story of Noah's Ark, shortly before the Flood. Both Noah and Lamech receive mysterious instructions from God (known as El) concerning the building of the Ark. The twins come to understand that unicorns who can traverse space and time live in the oasis. Sinister supernatural beings known as the nephilim distrust the twins, and their human wives attempt to gather information about them. At several points, the wife of a nephil unsuccessfully attempts to seduce Sandy.

Separated for much of the book, the twins become more independent of each other and gain maturity over the course of a year in the desert. Both are in love with Noah's beautiful and virtuous daughter Yalith (and she with them), but neither twin declares his affection until the very end of the novel. Dennys convinces Noah to reconcile with his father, Lamech, and both twins eventually care for Lamech's gardens while he lies ill. After Lamech's death, Sandy is kidnapped, but is eventually found by Japheth. Suspense arises when it becomes clear that there is no place on the Ark reserved for Sandy, Dennys, or Yalith. After both twins assist in the construction of the Ark, Yalith is taken by the seraphim to the presence of El. Sandy and Dennys are then returned to their own time and place by unicorns summoned by the seraphim.

Major themes
The story largely concerns the teenaged twins' emotional coming of age, but, like the other three novels about the Murry family, includes elements of fantasy and Christian theology such as the seraphim, a heavenly race of angels and the nephilim, a race of giants that were the result of the mating of mortal women and angels are the main antagonists of the story (see Genesis 6:1-4 ). Author Donald R. Hettinga notes that the world of Noah's oasis is especially difficult for "the empirically minded twins" to accept because in L'Engle's theology of "a gradual Fall", it is still populated by manticores and unicorns, "everyone can still see angels," and some people "can still converse intimately with God." Similarities to the fantasy-science fiction works of C. S. Lewis, always present in L'Engle's oeuvre, are particularly notable here. The twins' difficulty in believing in things that exist outside their empiricist world is a trait they must overcome in the story, because it is only by believing in a "virtual unicorn" that they can obtain transportation back to their everyday world.

Biblical and other sources of immortal character names
Although previous books in the series touched on themes of Christian theology, Many Waters makes direct references to Biblical and Qabalistic mysticism, particularly in its supernatural characters. While A Wind in the Door featured a "singular cherubim" with the fabricated name of Proginoskes, many of the seraphim and nephilim are named after obscure mystical entities:

Seraphim
The Seraphim are angels, although the text declines to explicitly name them as such even when asked directly. They serve as protectors, healers, and advisors, and form special friendships with pious people. They have wings colored in gold, silver or blue. Each has a preferred animal form, often mammals or birds, although some appear even as reptiles and insects. They regard the Nephilim as their brothers, in spite of the schism between them.
 Adnarel, originally one of the leaders who follow the four leaders who divide the four parts of the year in the Book of Enoch 82:14.
 Aariel, variant of Ariel, "lion of God". The name occurs with some frequency in the Old Testament and in rabbinical literature. (Note that Aariel frequently appears in the novel in the form of a lion.)
 Abasdarhon, originally the angel who rules over the fifth hour of the night. The name also appears in the Steganographia of Johannes Trithemius.
 Abdiel, a seraph in the Sepher Raziel and a character in Milton's Paradise Lost.
 Akatriel, one of the Angels of Presence.
 Achsah, wife of Othniel in the Old Testament. Curiously, this seraph is named after a mortal character.
 Admael, one of the seven angels set over the earth.
 Adabiel is mentioned in the alt.magick Kabbalah FAQ as a member of the seven archangels according to The Hierarchy of the Blessed Angels, although the 1635 poetic work by Thomas Heywood uses the name Adahiel for this archangel associated with the planet Jupiter.
 Adnachiel is associated by many astrology websites with the zodiac sign Sagittarius.

Nephilim
The Nephilim seem to be fallen angels who cannot return to heaven, although they claim to have willingly chosen to leave paradise for the sake of material pleasures. They are lusty hedonists who seduce young women with their beauty and riches. They have wings and eyes colored in violets and reds. They often take the form of insects, reptiles, and desert scavengers. They have adversarial attitudes toward the Seraphim.
 Ugiel, second of the unholy sefirot according to Moses de Burgos.
 Rofocale, after Lucifuge Rofocale, governor of Hell in The Sworn Book of Honorius.
 Eisheth, an angel of prostitution and the consort of the demon Samael.
 Eblis, variant of Iblis, the primary devil in Islam.
 Estael is named as an intelligence of Jupiter in The Secret Grimoire of Turiel, purportedly a sixteenth-century grimoire.
 Negarsanel, variant of Nasargiel, an angel of Hell according to The Legends of the Jews by Rabbi Louis Ginzberg.
 Rugziel, a fallen angel.
 Rumael, twentieth of the twenty-one named fallen angels in 1 Enoch 69.
 Rumjal, sixth named of the fallen angels in 1 Enoch 69.
 Ertrael, another fallen angel named in 1 Enoch.
 Naamah, another consort of Samael.

Reception
Kirkus Reviews called the book "the kind of intricate tale with complex characters and relationships that L'Engle's readers have come to expect... A carefully wrought fable, entwining disparate elements from unicorns to particle physics, this will be enjoyed for its suspense and humor as well as its other levels of meaning." Writing for The New York Times, Newbery Medal-winning author Susan Cooper wrote, "Analogies between the Flood and the possibility of nuclear destruction are suggested from time to time, but no didactic conclusion is forced out of them... Miss L'Engle is above all a skillful storyteller, and every admirer of 'A Wrinkle in Time' will have fun with 'Many Waters.'"

Series notes
Many Waters is an anomaly among the books of the Time Quintet. Meg and Charles Wallace Murry, the protagonists of the other three books, only appear on the last two pages of this one, while Sandy and Dennys, usually minor characters, are fully developed. Written after A Swiftly Tilting Planet, it nevertheless takes place about five years before that book, and about five years after A Wrinkle in Time.  If one reads the books in the order of internal chronology, Many Waters thus interrupts the saga of Meg and Charles Wallace for a side trip with the "ordinary" members of the Murry family.  Since the story was not written before Planet was published, the latter book does not fully take into account the twins' expanded understanding of the world beyond the everyday, instead showing some continued skepticism on their part.
However, this aspect of their character is less extreme than in earlier books. For the twins, being immersed in Noah's world "stretches their sense of reality".  Sandy and Dennys appear to retain this change in attitude as adults, particularly in A House Like a Lotus, in which Sandy acts as a mentor to his eldest niece, Polly O'Keefe. In the previous book in the series, A Wind in the Door, Meg is informed that Sandy and Dennys will become "Teachers", a metaphoric role that they appear to play as adults because of their experiences in Many Waters. However, An Acceptable Time, the fifth book in the so-called Spacetime Quintet (the Time Quartet plus the fifth and final novel about Calvin and  Meg's daughter Polly, who Meg is pregnant with in A Swiftly Tilting Planet), does not include the Twins as either skeptics or teachers.

References

External links

 L'Engle's Official Site
 A Wrinkle In Time Quintet Excerpts - Many Waters

1986 American novels
Children's fantasy novels
American young adult novels
Novels by Madeleine L'Engle
Time Quintet
1986 science fiction novels
Novels about time travel
1986 fantasy novels
Farrar, Straus and Giroux books
Novels about Noah's Ark
1986 children's books